Myriopholis perreti is a species of snake in the family Leptotyphlopidae. The species is endemic to western Central Africa.

Etymology
The specific name, perreti, is in honor of Swiss herpetologist Jean-Luc Perret.

Geographic range
M. perreti is found in Cameroon and Gabon. It may also occur in the Republic of Congo.

Habitat
M. perreti inhabits forest areas.

Reproduction
M. perreti is oviparous.

References

Further reading
Adalsteinsson SA, Branch WR, Trape S, Vitt LJ, Hedges SB (2009). "Molecular phylogeny, classification, and biogeography of snakes of the family Leptotyphlopidae (Reptilia, Squamata)". Zootaxa 2244: 1-50. (Myriopholis peretti, new combination).
Chippaux J-F, Jackson K (2019). Snakes of Central and Western Africa. Baltimore: Johns Hopkins University Press. 448 pp. .
Roux-Estève R (1979). "Une nouvelle espèce de Leptotyphlops (Serpentes) du Cameroun: Leptotyphlops perreti". Revue Suisse de Zoologie 86 (2): 463–466. (Leptotyphlops perreti, new species). (in French with abstract in English).

Myriopholis
Reptiles described in 1979